Corcovado National Park is a National Park on the Osa Peninsula, in Osa Canton, southwestern Costa Rica (9° North, 83° West), which is part of the Osa Conservation Area. It is the largest park in Costa Rica and extends over about a third of the Osa Peninsula. It is widely considered the crown jewel in the extensive system of national parks and biological reserves spread across the country. National Geographic has called it "the most biologically intense place on Earth in terms of biodiversity". 

The park conserves the largest primary forest on the American Pacific coastline and one of the few remaining sizable areas of lowland tropical forests in the world. Historically, logging has taken place in lowland areas due to their easy accessibility and the presence of the largest and most economically valuable trees. But those habitats, which feature diverse vegetation, are also usually the richest in biodiversity. What is left of the originally rich lowland forests is usually too small an area to support the original natural biodiversity. Larger animals, especially, need a large habitat free of human activity. This means that even tourism, the economic incentive for Costa Rica and other developing nations to preserve and protect parks such as Corcovado, actually threatens the long-term biodiversity of the park.

Biodiversity

Corcovado is home to a sizable population of the endangered Baird's tapir and a small population of the rare harpy eagle. The park's rivers and lagoons are home to the American crocodile and spectacled caiman, along with bull sharks. Corcovado is also one of the final strongholds of the jaguar within Central America, and several other felines are also present, including ocelot, margay, jaguarundi, and puma. All four Costa Rican monkey species can be seen within the park, including the endangered Central American squirrel monkey, white-faced capuchin, mantled howler, and Geoffroy's spider monkey. Other mammals present include two-toed and three-toed sloth, collared peccary, northern tamandua, and silky anteater. Poison dart frogs, red-eyed tree frogs, glass frogs, and several species of snake (including the venomous fer-de-lance and bushmaster) are also present within the park.

Most animal sightings can be expected along the coast, including scarlet macaws (the largest population in the country), hermit crabs, pelicans, spider monkeys, tamandua anteaters, pumas, white faced capuchin monkeys, lineated woodpeckers and coatis.

Other animals in the park include Central American squirrel monkeys, mantled howler monkeys, both two-toed and three-toed sloths, agoutis, giant anteaters, great curassows, black hawks, spectacled owls, hummingbirds, 220 species of butterflies, golden orb spiders, otters and raccoons. Four species of sea turtle (green, Pacific ridley, hawksbill, and leatherback) nest on the beaches.

The abundance in wildlife can in part be explained by the variety of vegetation types, at least thirteen, including montane forest (which covers more than half the park) cloud forest, jolillo forest (palm swamp), prairie forest, alluvial plains forest, swamp forest, freshwater herbaceous swamp and mangrove, together holding over 500 tree species, including purple heart, poponjoche, nargusta, banak, cow tree, espave and crabwood. The high biodiversity can also be attributed to Costa Rica's position on a north-south corridor for flora and fauna; part of the "land bridge" and wildlife corridor that links the large continents of North America and South America. In 41,800 hectares, Corcovado houses 3% of the world's biodiversity. National Geographic Society defined it as the most biologically intense place in the world.

The waters of the park are calm and rich in biodiversity. Cano Island Biological Reserve is one of a number of featured reserves along the coasts. These coasts, such as Drake Bay, are wintering and breeding grounds for humpback whales that come each winter. Ballena National Marine Park is specially designed for this species. Other baleen whales also migrate through the area such as Bryde's whale. Dolphins such as spinner and rough-toothed, and smaller cetaceans such as false killer whales and killer whales are seasonal migrants to these areas. Manatees can be observed occasionally at Manzanillo Beach, Talamanca, and Limon.

Creation and threats

Because of the remoteness of the peninsula, logging only began in the 1960s. By 1975 there were plans for a major international logging operation. Researchers petitioned President Daniel Oduber to protect the area, which he did by making it a National Park. For this he received the Albert Schweitzer Award from the Animal Welfare Institute. The already present goldminers were allowed to stay. By 1986 their number had increased to about 1,000 (not counting their families), who also hunted wildlife. It was decided to evict them. There is, however, still some illegal mining going on (using more destructive modern mining methods), considered the second invasion, there are about 400 miners currently. It is estimated that 38% of the park (16.000 hectares) have been exploited by goldminers. Illegal logging is not frequent, but the trees that are removed are scarce and essential to the ecosystem.

Increased tourism has led to an increased presence of humans in the park, which may threaten the long-term survival of the park's larger mammals. To help combat the threat of over-exposure, many agencies and other groups (including Conservation International, The Nature Conservancy, WWF–U.S., rain-forest conservation groups in several countries, Catholic Relief Service, Organization of American States, and the Costa Rican, Danish, Dutch, Swedish and United States governments) have come together to provide aid to the conservation cause.

Visiting

Corcovado National Park is open to the public and can be visited on day trips and for overnight visits. As of February 1, 2014 all Corcovado visitors must be accompanied by certified professional guides. During the wet months (July to November) parts of the park may be closed.

There are two tracks, one coastal and one inland, and four ranger stations in the park where one can stay overnight; three at the park entrances and one at the intersection of the two tracks. One track runs Northwest to Southeast along the coast to La Leona ecolodge, with the Estación Sirena roughly in the middle.  The second track runs inland from Estacion Sirena to Estación Los Patos at the Eastern end of the park.

The coastal track has several rivers that must be crossed by fording, but it's risky during high tide or for inexperienced hikers. Rio Sirena is commonly regarded as the most dangerous of crossings, primarily because it flows directly into the massive Laguna Corcovado in the isolated heart of the park. Bull sharks are present within the river and can sometimes be seen at the river mouth during high tide. American crocodiles are also present within the river. Spectacled caiman are present further up river and within Laguna Corcovado in larger numbers. The Rio Claro, which is approximately 40 minutes south of Rio Sirena, is said to be safer. Small American crocodiles and spectacled caiman are also present within the Rio Claro, albeit in smaller numbers than Rio Sirena. The Rio Madrigal, just north of the park entrance, is much smaller and may be home to spectacled caiman.

References

External links

practical information for visitors
extensive background information
guide for visitors

National parks of Costa Rica
Protected areas established in 1975
Geography of Puntarenas Province
Tourist attractions in Puntarenas Province
Isthmian–Pacific moist forests